José Ángel Efa Nchama (born 29 January 1992) is an Equatorial Guinean footballer who plays as a forward for Leones Vegetarianos FC and the Equatorial Guinea national team.

International career
Efa made his international debut for Equatorial Guinea on 28 July 2019.

International goals
Scores and results list Equatorial Guinea's goal tally first.

References

1992 births
Living people
Association football forwards
Equatoguinean footballers
Equatorial Guinea international footballers
Leones Vegetarianos FC players